Orlando Sports Stadium ( Eddie Graham Sports Complex) was an indoor arena, located in Orlando, Florida at 2285 N Econlockhatchee Trail. The venue was opened in 1967 by GC "Pete" Ashlock and was sold in 1981 to Edward Gossett (Eddie Graham) and renamed after professional wrestler and promoter Eddie Graham.  After his death the venue transferred to Mike Graham and later, Tony Andrews. It closed in 1993 and was demolished in 1995.

During its existence, it hosted numerous concerts, professional wrestling and boxing contests.

The arena played host to rock band Led Zeppelin on August 31, 1971, and the Rolling Thunder Revue concert tour on April 23, 1976, headed by Bob Dylan, as well as Elvis Presley who played there on February 15, 1977, six months before his death. 
The Beach Boys, Edgar Winter and Deep Purple played concerts there. Former world champion kick boxer Don "The Dragon" Wilson from Cocoa Beach fought there. George Wallace campaigned for president there.

The building was a basic indoor arena, no air conditioning, concrete floor, wood plank benches, and plywood doors on the stalls in the bathroom. It was closed by the Orange County Building Department because of code violations and was demolished in November 1995. The land on which it stood is now occupied by a housing development called Econ River Estates.

References

1967 establishments in Florida
1995 disestablishments in Florida
Defunct indoor arenas in Florida
Demolished music venues in the United States
Demolished sports venues in Florida
Defunct sports venues in Florida
Music venues in Florida
Sports venues demolished in 1995
Sports venues in Orlando, Florida
Music venues in Orlando, Florida
Sports venues completed in 1967